Kotṟavai, also spelled Kotravai or Korravai, is the goddess of war and victory in the Tamil tradition. She is also the mother goddess and the goddess of fertility, agriculture, and hunters. In the latter form, she is sometimes referred to by other names and epithets in the Tamil tradition of South India and Sri Lanka, such as Atha, Mari, Suli, and Neeli. She was later syncretised with the Hindu goddesses Durga, Kali and Parvati.

The war goddess Kottava was propitiated with elaborate offerings of meat and toddy.
She is among the earliest documented goddesses in the Tamil Sangam literature, and also found in later Tamil literature. She is mentioned in 1 poem of the Paripāṭal , But the dedicated poem to her have been lost in the history. She is mentioned in the Pattuppattu anthology – the long Tamil poems dated between 300 BCE to 300 CE, including the Neṭunalvāṭai, Maturaikkanci, Poruṇarāṟṟuppaṭai, and Paṭṭiṉappālai. In the Tamil epic Silappadikaram (c. 2nd-century), she is said to be the goddess of the Pālai region.

Her name is derived from the Tamil word korram, which means "victory, success, bravery". The earliest references to Kotravai are found in the ancient Tamil grammar Tolkappiyam, considered to be the earliest work of the ancient Sangam literature. 

She is also seen as a mother goddess, a symbol of fertility and success in agriculture. Traditional rural communities offer the first harvest to her. As war goddess who is blood thirsty, some texts such as the Silappadikaram and Agananuru mention that warrior devotees would, in a frenzy, offer their own head to the goddess.

In Tamil Nadu,  the blackbuck (Kalaimaan) is considered to be the vehicle of the Tamil goddess Korravai  She is sometimes shown as riding a lion, as in the 7th-century mandapam of the Group of Monuments at Mahabalipuram, Tamil Nadu. Both the lion and blackbuck is shown with a standing Korravai in a rock-relief panel at the Varaha mandapam of Mahabalipuram.

She is depicted as a deity with several arms holding different weapons. She is said to be mother of the god Murugan. Animal sacrifices and dancing rituals are a part of the worship of this goddess.

Notes and references

Bibliography 

 Mahalakshmi, R. (2009). "Caṇkam literature as a social prism: an interrogation". Chapter 3 (29–41) in Brajadulal Chattopadhyaya (editor). A Social History of Early India. Pearson Education, India.
 
 Kersenboom-Story, Saskia C. (1987). Nityasumaṅgalī: devadasi tradition in South India. Motilal Banarsidass.
 Kinsley, David R. (1988). Hindu goddesses: visions of the divine feminine in the Hindu religious tradition. Hermeneutics: Studies in the History of Religions 12. University of California Press.
 Tiwari, Jagdish Narain (1985). Goddess Cults in Ancient India (with special reference to the first seven centuries A.D.). Sundeep Prakashan. [Adapted from his PhD thesis accepted by the Australian National University in 1971.]

Hindu goddesses
Tamil deities
War goddesses
Nature goddesses
Lion deities